Egoboo is a 3D open source dungeon crawling action role-playing game with support for Windows XP, Windows Vista, Linux, Mac OS X, and some earlier versions of Windows. Egoboo has been downloaded over 590,000 times since its first release over SourceForge alone until mid 2016, while Egoboo can be downloaded from other sources as well.

History 
The original Egoboo was the creation of Aaron Bishop (who was at first known only as "Programmer X") in 1999. With the help of his brother Ben Bishop, he eventually released it as open source. In 2001 an alpha was released. Soon after this, however, Aaron stopped developing the project and it was abandoned. Fairly soon after this, the "Zippy Project" took over, and the game's development continued. The Zippy project eventually died as well. After this, it was taken over by Johan Jansen (alias "Zefz") and the "Resurrection" project.
Currently Egoboo is being developed by the previous "Resurrection" project, which has reorganized itself as the official development team.

Plot 
Egoboo'''s story revolves around the capture of Lord Bishop, the king of Bishopia. He was taken away by the evil Dracolich for unknown reasons, and brave adventurers have risen up to try to rescue him. The Dracolich hid in the Abyss, which is only accessible through secret catacombs. The catacombs are sealed, however, and can only be unlocked by the Legendary Sporks of Yore.
Characters must progress through the five Palaces in order to retrieve the Sporks so that the catacombs can be opened.

 Gameplay 

The player must progress through areas (Palace, Catacomb, Abyss) in order to proceed and finish the main storyline.
The game has no world map. Instead, locations are selected from a list of available "modules" which unlock more modules when finished.Egoboo currently features eleven playable character classes, each with its own unique abilities and skills. Each one has its own special "starter module." When the player completes a starter module, the character is saved and can enter the other areas of the game. There is no limit to how many of each class the player saves, but there is a limit to how many total characters can be displayed on the character selection screen. All of the classes but four are available at the beginning of the game. The Zombi, G'nome, Tourist and Archaeologist classes are unlocked when certain requirements are met. "Hero classes" are currently being made, which are 'level ups' of the base classes. Each hero class has advanced skills, but also some disadvantages.

Much of the game revolves around combat. There are several different types of weapons (crushing, slashing, etc.) that do different types of damage (e.g. cuts, piercings, fire, ice). Each type of weapon has its own advantages and disadvantages, and depending on the type of damage they deal, they may be more or less effective against certain monsters. In addition to normal melee (or ranged) combat, some character classes are able to use magic. Magic is divided into two types, divine and arcane. Divine magic focuses on healing. It can be used when no weapons are in the characters hand to heal nearby allies, or it can be channeled by special Relics with even more powerful effects. Arcane magic is used through books, which can create various magical effects, some more powerful than others. Most Arcane magic focuses on attacks or enchantments. All magic uses up mana, which can be restored with special potions, and also naturally regenerates.

Currently only co-operative play on a single machine is available. The developers hope to eventually add full online multiplayer support with multiple modes of play, including competitive game modes.

 Development Egoboo is not yet considered to be complete, though it has been developed for approximately ten years, with new versions being released periodically. Currently the game is developed primarily by a four-person development team, but several other contributors also work on creating new modules (maps), items, monsters, and character classes. The game can be easily edited so new weapons, monsters, etc. can be added without altering the underlying source code. Egoboo has its own scripting language that is used for editing all objects (which includes characters, items, monsters, furniture, etc.). All these objects use 3D models with a .md2 format, and textures (primarily in .png and .bmp formats). The game's modules are edited and created with an external program called Egomap. Unfortunately, Egomap has a reputation for being buggy, and is not being actively developed.

 Reception Egoboo'' has achieved some popularity in the open-source gaming community, has been downloaded over 590,000 times until July 2016, and has been integrated in several linux distributions. Egoboo received reception from various game and open-source focussed news outlets over the years.

Due to the source code availability the game was ported later by other communities to new platforms as well, like the OpenPandora handheld device.

See also

References

External links 
 
 Newsforge Interview on NewsForge (archived)
 Linux Dev Center Interview (archived)

Action role-playing video games
Linux games
MacOS games
Windows games
Open-source video games
Role-playing video games
1999 video games